Fivelingo or Fivelgo is a historical region and one of the Ommelanden (shires) in the province of Groningen. It was located southeast of Hunsingo, northeast of Gorecht, and northwest of Oldambt, and southwest of the Wadden Sea. Fivelingo was named after the historical river Fivel.

References 

Regions of Groningen (province)